Kieron Testart is a former Canadian politician who was elected to the Legislative Assembly of the Northwest Territories in the 2015 election. He represented the electoral district of Kam Lake  until the 2019 election, when he was defeated by Caitlin Cleveland. Testart finished third in the electoral district behind Cleveland and Robert Hawkins.

An employee of the territorial Department of Justice, Testart was a candidate for the Liberal Party of Canada nomination for Northwest Territories in the 2015 federal election, but withdrew from the race to endorse Michael McLeod.

In 2018, Testart introduced an amendment to the territorial Elections Act to permit the introduction of party politics in the legislative assembly, but his motion received no support from other MLAs and was dropped. In 2019, he planned to organize a group of ideologically aligned MLA candidates in the 2019 Northwest Territories general election into a "Liberal Democratic" slate, but backed off from the plan after it was leaked to the press.

References 

Living people
Members of the Legislative Assembly of the Northwest Territories
People from Yellowknife
21st-century Canadian politicians
Year of birth missing (living people)